Eberhard Riedel (born 14 February 1938) is a German former alpine skier who competed in the 1960 Winter Olympics, the 1964 Winter Olympics, and the 1968 Winter Olympics. He was born in Lauter, Saxony, Germany.

Olympic events 
1960 Winter Olympics in Squaw Valley, competing for United Team of Germany:
 Men's downhill – 16th place

1964 Winter Olympics in Innsbruck, competing for United Team of Germany:
 Men's giant slalom – 15th place
 Men's slalom – 30th place

1968 Winter Olympics in Grenoble, competing for East Germany:
 Men's downhill – did not finish
 Men's giant slalom – 41st place
 Men's slalom – 13th place

References 

1938 births
Living people
People from Erzgebirgskreis
Free German Youth members
Members of the 4th Volkskammer
East German male skiers
German male alpine skiers
Alpine skiers at the 1960 Winter Olympics
Alpine skiers at the 1964 Winter Olympics
Olympic alpine skiers of the United Team of Germany
Alpine skiers at the 1968 Winter Olympics
Olympic alpine skiers of East Germany
Sportspeople from Saxony
20th-century German people